Medicine Creek State Recreation Area (SRA) is a state recreation area in southern Nebraska, United States. The recreation area surrounds the 1,768-acre Medicine Creek Reservoir also known as Harry Strunk Lake, a reservoir on Medicine Creek. The recreation area is managed by the Nebraska Game and Parks Commission. There are camping, fishing, swimming, and other recreational opportunities available.

References

External links
 Medicine Creek State Recreation Area - Nebraska Game & Parks Commission
 Nebraska Game and Parks Commission

Protected areas of Frontier County, Nebraska
Protected areas of Nebraska
State parks of Nebraska